The Copper Gauntlet is the second book in The Magisterium Series written by Holly Black and Cassandra Clare. It was published on September 1, 2015.

References 

Children's fantasy novels
Novels by Holly Black